Louisiana Hayride is a 1944 American comedy film directed by Charles Barton and starring Judy Canova, Ross Hunter and Richard Lane. It was made by Columbia Pictures rather than Republic, with whom Canova mostly worked during the decade. The film's art direction was by Lionel Banks and Walter Holscher.

Cast
 Judy Canova as Judy Crocker 
 Ross Hunter as Gordon Pearson 
 Richard Lane as J. Huntington McMasters 
 Lloyd Bridges as Montague Price 
 Matt Willis as Jeb Crocker 
 George McKay as Canada Brown 
 Minerva Urecal as Ma Crocker 
 Hobart Cavanaugh as Malcolm Cartwright
 Jessie Arnold as Aunt Hepzibah (uncredited)
 Russell Hicks as H.C. Forbes
 Arthur Loft as Studio director
 Ernie Adams as Pawnbroker
 Eddie Kane as Warburton
 Nelson Leigh as Wiffle, Makeup Artist
 Robert Homans as Police Officer Conlon

See also
List of American films of 1944

References

Bibliography
 Hischak, Thomas H. The Oxford Companion to the American Musical: Theatre, Film, and Television. Oxford University Press, 2008.
 Hurst, Richard M. Republic Studios: Beyond Poverty Row and the Majors. Scarecrow Press, 2007.

External links

1944 films
American comedy films
American black-and-white films
1944 comedy films
1940s English-language films
Films directed by Charles Barton
Columbia Pictures films
1940s American films